Fiesole is a town and comune of the Metropolitan City of Florence in the Italian region of Tuscany, on a scenic height above Florence, 5 km (3 miles) northeast of that city. It has structures dating to Etruscan and Roman times.

Since the fourteenth century, the city has always been considered a getaway for members of the upper class of Florence and, up to this day, Fiesole remains noted for its very expensive residential properties, just as well as its centuries-old villas and their formal gardens. The city is generally considered to be the wealthiest and most affluent suburb of Florence. In 2016, the city had the highest median family income in the whole of Tuscany.

Fiesole is a centre of higher education. The campus of the European University Institute is situated in the suburb and uses several historical buildings including the Badia Faesolina and the Villa Schifanoia. Additionally, the American universities, Harvard, Georgetown, and Saint Mary's of Minnesota all maintain campuses at Fiesole.

History 

Fiesole (Etruscan Viesul, Viśl, Vipsul) was probably founded sometime during the ninth century BC, as it was an important member of the Etruscan confederacy. The remains of its prehistoric walls and ancient structures have been preserved and an archaeological museum in the town presents artifacts from and information about these cultural periods.

The earliest known recorded mention of the town dates to 283 BC, when the Etruscan town, then known as Faesulae, was conquered by the Romans. In Roman antiquity, it was the seat of a famous school of augurs and, every year, twelve young men were sent there from Rome to study the art of divination. 

The old town was either destroyed in the Social War or alternatively by Sulla in 80 BC, in reprisal for supporting the populares faction in Rome.  Sulla later colonized it with veterans.  This colony who afterward, under the leadership of Gaius Mallius, supported the cause of Catilina.

It has been restored partially enough to provide a good idea of its structure. Above it is an embanking wall of irregular masonry, and below it some remains of Roman baths, including five parallel vaults of concrete. More than 1,000 silver denarii, all coined before 63 BC, were found at Faesulae in 1829. A small museum contains the objects found in the excavations of the theatre.

Fiesole was the scene of Stilicho's great victory over the Germanic hordes of the Vandals and Suebi under Radagaisus in 406.  During the Gothic War (536–553), the town was besieged several times. In 539, Justin, the Byzantine general, captured it and razed its fortifications.

It was an independent town for several centuries in the early Middle Ages, no less powerful than Florence in the valley below, and many wars arose between them. In 1010 and 1025, Fiesole was sacked by the Florentines. Later, it was conquered by Florence in 1125, when its leading families were obliged to take up their residence in Florence, which still holds true today. Dante reflects this rivalry in his Divine Comedy by referring to "the beasts of Fiesole" (Inferno XV.73).

By the fourteenth century, rich Florentines had countryside villas in Fiesole, and one of them is the setting of the frame narrative of the Decameron. Boccaccio's poem Il Ninfale fiesolano is a mythological account of the origins of the community.

It is also documented that the artist and scientist Leonardo da Vinci experimented for the first time with early flying models on the hills of Fiesoles.

Main sites 
Remnants of Etruscan walls   
Roman baths   
Roman theatre   
Palazzo Comunale (Town Hall) of the fourteenth century   
The Cathedral of Fiesole (Il Duomo) that contains the shrine of St. Romulus, martyr, according to legend the first Bishop of Fiesole, and that of his martyred companions; the shrine of St. Donatus of Fiesole; and its altarpiece by Pietro Perugino
The Badia or ancient cathedral of St. Romulus, built in 1028 by Bishop Jacopo Bavaro with materials taken from several older edifices at the foot of the hill on which Fiesole stands and were supposed to cover the site of the martyrdom of St. Romulus. It contains notable sculptures by Mino da Fiesole; the old cathedral became a Benedictine abbey that passed into the hands of the Canons Regular of the Lateran. It once possessed a valuable library, long since dispersed. The abbey was closed in 1778   

The room in the Episcopal Palace where Carmelite bishop St. Andrew Corsini lived and died   
The little Church of Santa Maria Primerana in the cathedral square, where the same saint was warned by Our Lady of his approaching death. Built in 996 and further expanded in medieval times, it has maintained the Gothic presbytery from that period. It received a new façade in the late sixteenth century, with graffito decoration by Ludovico Buti. The interior, on a single hall, has a thirteenth-century panel portraying Madonna with Child. In the transept are two marble bas-reliefs by Francesco da Sangallo and a terracotta from Andrea della Robbia's workshop.   
The Church of S. Alessandro, with the shrine of St. Alexander, bishop and martyr   
The Monastery of San Francesco on the crest of the hill, with the cells of St. Bernardine of Siena and seven Franciscan Beati   
Church of San Girolamo, the home of Venerable Carlo dei Conti Guidi, founder of the Hieronymites of Fiesole (1360)   
San Domenico, the novice-home of Fra Angelico and of St. Antoninus of Florence   
Fontanelle, a villa near S. Domenico, where St. Aloysius came to live in the hot summer months, while a page at the court of Grand Duke Francesco de' Medici   

   
Villa I Tatti, a campus of Harvard University   
Villa Medici   
Villa Le Balze, a campus of Georgetown University   
Villa Palmieri   
Villa Schifanoia   
Villa Sparta, former residence in exile of the Greek royal family
 Fonte Lucente, where a crucifix is greatly revered as miraculous   
 Castello di Vincigliata   
 Episcopal Seminary of Fiesole   
In the neighborhood are:
Monte Senario, the cradle of the Servite Order, where its seven holy founders lived in austerity
S. Martino di Mensola, with the body of St. Andrew, an Irish saint, still incorrupt   
Monte Ceceri and the monument to Leonardo da Vinci's attempted flight

Notable residents 
 Angelo Maria Bandini, Italian author 
 Bernard Berenson, American art historian
 Giovanni Bocaccio, Renaissance humanist
 Arnold Böcklin, Swiss painter
 St. Andrew Corsini, a Florentine Carmelite friar (1302–January 6, 1373), Bishop of Fiesole
 Alexandre Dumas, French writer
 Bridget of Fiesole, ninth-century Irish nun
 Mino da Fiesole, Florentine sculptor (c.1429—1484) and painter
 Helen of Greece and Denmark, queen mother of Romania (was awarded the honorary title of Righteous Among the Nations in 1993 for her humanitarian efforts to save the Jews of Romania)   
 Hermann Hesse, German-Swiss writer, featured the city in his well-known novel Peter Camenzind
 Paul of Greece, King of Greece
 Paul Klee, German painter 
 Francesco Landini (c.1325–1397), composer, singer, poet, organist, and instrument maker
 Paolo Litta, composer
 Elisabeth Mann-Borgese, German writer
 Lorenzo Monaco (1370–1424), painter 
 Marcel Proust, French writer 
 Andrew the Scot, ninth-century Irish archdeacon
 Gertrude Stein and Alice B. Toklas spent their summers in Fiesole before the First World War
 Roger Verity Anglo-Italian entomologist
 Frank Lloyd Wright, American architect
 Miloš Crnjanski, Serbian writer and poet who wrote his 1973 poem Stražilovo in Fiesole

In literature 
The Decameron by Giovanni Boccaccio is set in the slopes of Fiesole. The city was featured equally in the novels Peter Camenzind (1904) by Hermann Hesse, A Room with a View (1908) by E. M. Forster, and in the book of travel essays Italian Hours (1909) by Henry James.

In contemporary art 
 Wall mural in Grossi Florentino, executed by students of Napier Waller under supervision

See also 
Diocese of Fiesole

Notes

References 
 Mauro Marrani, Il contado fiesolano. Grafica European Center of Fine Arts, Firenze 2010.

External links 

Official site
Satellite image from Google Maps

 
Cities and towns in Tuscany
Etruscan sites
Roman sites of Tuscany